The 2022 Basildon Borough Council election took place on 5 May 2022 to elect members of Basildon Borough Council in Essex. This was on the same day as other local elections.

Results summary

Ward results

Billericay East

Billericay West

Burstead

Crouch

Fryerns

Laindon Park

Langdon Hills

Lee Chapel North

Nethermayne

Pitsea North West

Pitsea South East

Wickford Castledon

Wickford North

Wickford Park

By-elections

Nethermayne

References

Basildon
2022
2020s in Essex
May 2022 events in the United Kingdom